Baga (also Bagas) was an Amazigh king of Mauretania about 225 BC. It is not known for sure, though quite likely, that he was a member of an older dynasty. 

King Baga appeared in the historical record during the events of the second Punic war. Upon Masinissa’s return to Africa he had to either pass through Massaesylian territory, his arch rivals, or through Mauretanian territory. Choosing the latter, he was provided with 4000 Moorish cavalry units by King Baga of Mauretania that stayed with Masinissa until he reached the borders of his own kingdom. Baga also provided military support during the final chapter of the Second Punic War in the fight against Hannibal.

According to Gabriel Camps, this signifies that Baga was no petty king, and that he had strong control over vast resources and territories, from the Atlantic Ocean to the river Mulucha (probably the same as Moulouya River in Morocco), and from the Mediterranean Sea to the south of the Atlas Mountains.

His kingdom was inherited by Bocchus I, who was probably either his son or grandson.

References

Kings of Mauretania
2nd-century BC rulers in Africa
2nd-century BC Berber people
3rd-century BC rulers in Africa